Joe Jimenez (June 10, 1926 – August 11, 2007) was an American professional golfer, best known for winning the 1978 PGA Seniors' Championship.

Jimenez, who was of Mexican American descent, was born in Kerrville, Texas. He was a 1952 graduate of Trinity University with majors in biology and physical education. Jimenez played on the PGA Tour in the 1950s, 1960s and 1970s. He spent many years (1964–1991) as the club pro at the Jefferson City Country Club in Jefferson City, Missouri. His best showing in a major championship was a T-45 at the 1958 U.S. Open. The highlight of his career came when he won the 1978 PGA Seniors' Championship in a playoff over Manuel de la Torre and Joe Cheves with a birdie on the first extra hole of a sudden-death playoff.

Jimenez holds or formerly held two of golf's "shoot below your age" records. At the 1991 GTE Northwest Classic, a Senior PGA Tour event, 65-year-old Jimenez became the youngest player to shoot his age or lower in a tournament on one of golf's major professional circuits by shooting a 63. This record was later broken when 61-year-old Walter Morgan shot a 60 in the AT&T Canada Senior Open Championship. Jimenez still holds the most-strokes-below-age (7) record. He shot a 62 during the 1995 Ameritech Senior Open at the age of 69.

Since 1974, the Jefferson City Country Club has hosted a tournament in his honor, the Joe Jimenez Invitational He holds several Georgia-Pacific Grand Champions records.

Jiminez died at his home in San Antonio, Texas from renal failure brought on by lung cancer. He was 81 years old.

Tournament wins
this list is incomplete

Midwest PGA Championship - year unknown
Gateway PGA Championship - twice
South Central PGA Championship - once
Missouri Open
1960 Puerto Rico Open
1962 Midwest PGA Championship
1978 PGA Seniors' Championship, World Senior Championship
1998 Liberty Mutual Legends of Golf - Demaret Division (with Charlie Sifford)
1999 Liberty Mutual Legends of Golf - Demaret Division (with Charlie Sifford)
2000 Liberty Mutual Legends of Golf - Demaret Division (with Charlie Sifford)

References

External links

American male golfers
PGA Tour golfers
PGA Tour Champions golfers
Golfers from San Antonio
Golfers from Missouri
American sportspeople of Mexican descent
People from Kerrville, Texas
Sportspeople from Jefferson City, Missouri
1926 births
2007 deaths